Venecia, previously known as Ospina Perez is a Colombian town and municipality in the Cundinamarca Department.

Municipalities of Cundinamarca Department